Zach K'reem Norton (born November 19, 1981) is a former American football defensive back who played one season with the Baltimore Ravens of the National Football League. He played college football at University of Cincinnati and attended Jefferson County High School in Monticello, Florida. He was also a member of the Hamburg Sea Devils, Kansas City Chiefs, BC Lions and Colorado Crush.

Professional career

Baltimore Ravens
Norton signed with the Baltimore Ravens on April 30, 2004 after going undrafted in the 2004 NFL Draft. He was released by the Ravens on June 19, 2006.

Kansas City Chiefs
Norton spent the 2006 season with the Kansas City Chiefs. He signed a two-year contract with the team on February 12, 2007. He was released by the Chiefs in May 2007.

BC Lions
Norton was signed by the BC Lions on August 28, 2007. He was released by the Lions on October 2, 2007.

Colorado Crush
Norton spent the 2008 season with the Colorado Crush. He was released by the Crush on May 12, 2008.

References

External links
Just Sports Stats
College stats
NFL Draft Scout

Living people
1981 births
Players of American football from Fort Lauderdale, Florida
American football defensive backs
African-American players of American football
Cincinnati Bearcats football players
Hamburg Sea Devils players
Baltimore Ravens players
Colorado Crush players
21st-century African-American sportspeople
20th-century African-American people